Renat Dadashov (also spelled Renat Dadaschow in German, born 17 May 1999) is a professional footballer who plays as a striker for Swiss Super League club Grasshoppers. Born in Germany, he plays for the Azerbaijan national team.

Early years
Dadashov was born in Rüdesheim am Rhein, Germany  with his family being Azeri. His parents moved to Germany from Baku, Azerbaijan. His father Oleg played for the Azerbaijani national water polo team during his youth. Renat has an elder brother, Rufat Dadashov who is also a football striker and played 16 games for Azerbaijan national team and scored 4 goals.

During his early years, Dadashov played at the football academies of SV Wehen Wiesbaden, Eintracht Frankfurt and RB Leipzig.

Club career

Eintracht Frankfurt
On 19 May 2017, Dadashov signed a three-year contract with Bundesliga side Eintracht Frankfurt. He scored 14 goals and 9 assists in 22 matches for Eintracht Frankfurt U-19 in the Under 19 Bundesliga.

Estoril
On 11 June 2018, Dadashov signed a two-year contract with Estoril.

Dadashov made his LigaPro debut for Estoril in a 4–0 home victory against Porto B on 11 August 2018. He scored his first goal for Estoril on 18 August 2018, in a 1–0 away victory against Braga B.

Wolverhampton Wanderers
On 6 August 2019, Dadashov signed a four-year contract with Wolverhampton Wanderers.

Loan to Paços de Ferreira
On 6 August 2019, Paços de Ferreira announced the signing of Dadashov on loan deal. He made his debut for Paços de Ferreira in the Primeira Liga on 24 August 2019, starting in the away match against Boavista, which finished as a 1–1 draw.

Loan to Grasshoppers
On 23 August 2020, Grasshopper Club Zürich announced the signing of Dadashov on loan deal. While training with the club however, Dadashov had sustained a cruciate knee ligament injury, and has undergone surgery, leaving him on the sidelines for a lengthy period. He would eventually return to Wolves on the 8 October to continue his treatment.

Loan to Tondela
On 29 July 2021, Dadashov joined Primeira Liga side Tondela on a season-long loan deal.

Grasshoppers
On 7 July 2022, Dadashov signed a two-year contract with Grasshoppers, along with his Wolves teammate Meritan Shabani. He made his debut in the team's first game of the season, coming in after the half-time break. His impact was immediate, as his first pass led to Grasshopper's second goal in the 47th minute. In the second game of the season, on 31 July 2022, he once again came on at half time and again had immediate impact, this time with his first goal for the Grasshoppers in the 49th minute of the game, equalizing for the 1–1 end result. For his performance he was voted SFL Best Player of the Round by the fans, later voted the best player for the month of August.

International career
Born in Germany to a Lezgin family from Azerbaijan, Dadashov was eligible to play for both countries. He played for the Azerbaijani U16 team during the summer of 2014. He was later invited to the German U16 where he scored four goals in six games. On 9 September 2015, Dadashov debuted for German U17 team and played 15 matches with 13 goals during the next year. He reached the semifinals of the 2016 UEFA European Under-17 Championship with the German team.

In early 2017, it was announced that Dadashov would represent the Azerbaijan national team. He made his senior international debut on 5 September, against San Marino in 2018 FIFA World Cup qualification.

Sponsorship
On 18 February 2020, Dadashov signed a sponsorship deal with German sportswear and equipment supplier, Adidas.

Career statistics

Club

International

International goals

References

External links
 
 Renat Dadashov at estorilpraia.pt

1999 births
Living people
People from Rheingau-Taunus-Kreis
Sportspeople from Darmstadt (region)
Footballers from Hesse
German footballers
Association football forwards
Azerbaijani footballers
Azerbaijan international footballers
Azerbaijan youth international footballers
Azerbaijan under-21 international footballers
Germany youth international footballers
Azerbaijani expatriate footballers
Expatriate footballers in Germany
Azerbaijani expatriate sportspeople in Germany
Eintracht Frankfurt players
Expatriate footballers in Portugal
Azerbaijani expatriate sportspeople in Portugal
Expatriate footballers in England
Expatriate footballers in Switzerland
Primeira Liga players
Liga Portugal 2 players
Swiss Challenge League players
G.D. Estoril Praia players
Wolverhampton Wanderers F.C. players
F.C. Paços de Ferreira players
Grasshopper Club Zürich players
Azerbaijani people of Lezgian descent
C.D. Tondela players